The 2019–20 network television schedule for the five major English commercial broadcast networks in Canada covers primetime hours from September 2019 through August 2020. The schedule is followed by a list per network of returning series, new series, and series canceled after the 2018–19 television season, for Canadian, American and other series.

CBC Television was first to announce its fall schedule on May 29, 2019, followed by Global and Citytv on May 30, and CTV and CTV 2 on June 6. As in the past, the commercial networks' announcements come shortly after the networks have had a chance to buy Canadian rights to new American series. CTV 2 and Global are not included on Saturday as they normally only schedule encore programming in primetime on Saturdays.

Legend

 Grey indicates encore programming.
 Light green indicates sporting events.
 Red indicates original Canadian programming.

Schedule
 New series are highlighted in bold. Series that have changed network are not highlighted as new series.
 All times given are in Canadian Eastern Time and Pacific Time (except for some live events or specials, including most sports, which are given in Eastern Time).

Sunday

Monday

Note: Global aired The Neighborhood at 7:30 p.m. Eastern, outside of primetime hours.
Note: CTV aired Bob Hearts Abishola at 7:30 p.m. Eastern, outside of winter primetime hours.
Note: Citytv aired Songland at 7 p.m. Eastern, outside of spring primetime hours.

Tuesday

Note: Global aired NCIS: New Orleans at 7 p.m. Eastern, outside of primetime hours.
Note: CTV aired The Conners at 7:30 p.m. Eastern, outside of winter primetime hours.

Wednesday

Note: CTV aired The Goldbergs at 7:30 p.m. Eastern, outside of primetime hours.
Note: Global airs FBI: Most Wanted at 7 p.m. Eastern, outside of winter primetime hours.

Thursday

Note: CTV aired Young Sheldon at 7:30 p.m. Eastern, outside of primetime hours.

Friday

Saturday

By network

CBC Television

Returning series:
22 Minutes
Anne
Back in Time for Winter
Baroness von Sketch Show
Battle of the Blades
Burden of Truth
Catastrophe
Coroner
The Detectives
Diggstown
Dragons' Den
The Fifth Estate
Fortunate Son
Frankie Drake Mysteries
The Great Canadian Baking Show
Heartland
High Arctic Haulers
Hockey Night in Canada (shared with Citytv)
In the Making
Kim's Convenience
Marketplace
Murdoch Mysteries
The National
The Nature of Things
Schitt's Creek
Still Standing
Workin' Moms

New series:
Endlings
Family Feud Canada
Find Me in Paris
Fridge Wars
Northern Rescue
The Oland Murder
Wild Bill
You Can't Ask That

Not returning from 2018–19:
Cavendish
Little Dog
Mr. D
Unspeakable
Vanity Fair

Citytv

Returning series:
America's Got Talent
The Bachelor
Black-ish
Bob's Burgers
Brooklyn Nine-Nine
Celebrity Family Feud
CityNews
Chicago Fire (moved from Global)
Chicago Med (moved from Global)
Chicago P.D. (moved from Global)
Dancing with the Stars
Family Guy
Hockey Night in Canada (shared with CBC)
Hudson & Rex
Little Big Shots
Manifest
A Million Little Things
Mom
Press Your Luck
The Simpsons
Songland

New series:
The Bachelor: The Greatest Seasons- Ever!
The Bachelor Presents: Listen to Your Heart
The Baker and the Beauty
Bless the Harts
Bluff City Law
Council of Dads
Duncanville
Fall in Love Fridays (Hallmark Channel original films)
Four Weddings and a Funeral
Godfather of Harlem
Labor of Love
Lincoln Rhyme: Hunt for the Bone Collector
Mixed-ish
Perfect Harmony
Vagrant Queen
The Moodys

Not returning from 2018–19:
The Bletchley Circle: San Francisco (returning for 2020–21)
Catch-22
The Cool Kids
The Gifted
Hell's Kitchen (returning for 2020–21)
Lethal Weapon
Life in Pieces
Mental Samurai (moved to CTV in 2020–21)
Modern Family (moved to Global)
The Murders
Murphy Brown
The Orville (moved to Star)
Paradise Hotel
Rel

CTV

Returning series:
Agents of S.H.I.E.L.D.
American Housewife (shared with CTV 2)
American Idol (shared with CTV 2)
Blindspot
Blue Bloods
Cardinal
The Conners
Criminal Minds
Ellen's Game of Games
God Friended Me
Grey's Anatomy
The Good Doctor
How to Get Away with Murder
In the Dark
Law & Order: Special Victims Unit
Love Island
Magnum P.I.
Mary's Kitchen Crush
The Masked Singer
Match Game
NFL
The Goldbergs
The Resident
The Rookie
Shark Tank (shared with CTV 2)
SportsCentre
Station 19
This Is Us
Unforgettable
World of Dance
Young Sheldon

New series:
9-1-1: Lone Star
All Rise
Almost Family (shared with CTV 2)
Bob Hearts Abishola
Double Your Dish
Emergence
Flirty Dancing
For Life
I Do, Redo
L.A.'s Finest
Marvel Sunday Night Movies
The Masked Singer: After the Mask
Stumptown
Transplant
Ultimate Tag
Who Wants to Be a Millionaire
Zoey's Extraordinary Playlist
United We Fall

Not returning from 2018–19:
The Alec Baldwin Show
The Amazing Race Canada (returning for 2021–22)
The Amazing Race USA (returned for 2020–21)
The Enemy Within
The Fix
Jann (returned for 2020–21)
The Kids Are Alright
MasterChef Canada (returned for 2020–21)
MasterChef Junior (returned for 2021–22)
MasterChef USA (returned for 2020–21)
The Village
Whiskey Cavalier

CTV 2

Returning series:
American Housewife (shared with CTV)
American Idol (shared with CTV)
America's Got Talent: The Champions
Football Night in America
Shark Tank (shared with CTV)
Sunday Night Football
The Voice

New series:
Almost Family (shared with CTV)
Outmatched
Pandora

Not returning from 2018–19:
Carter
For the People
Gotham
Splitting Up Together

Global

Returning series:
9-1-1
Big Brother Canada
Big Brother USA
Bull
The Good Place
Hawaii Five-0
MacGyver
Madam Secretary
Modern Family (moved from Citytv)
NCIS
NCIS: Los Angeles
NCIS: New Orleans
The Neighborhood
New Amsterdam
Schooled
SEAL Team
Single Parents
Superstore
Survivor
S.W.A.T.
The Titan Games
Will & Grace

New series:
Carol's Second Act
Crime Beat
Evil
FBI: Most Wanted
Kids Say the Darndest Things
Nurses
Prodigal Son
Tommy
Tough as Nails
Undercover Boss USA
The Unicorn

Not returning from 2018–19:
BH90210
Blood & Treasure (returning for 2021–22)
Celebrity Big Brother
Chicago Fire (moved to Citytv)
Chicago Med (moved to Citytv)
Chicago P.D. (moved to Citytv)
Dancing with the Stars: Juniors
Elementary
Happy Together
Holey Moley (moved to CTV in 2020–21)
I Feel Bad
The InBetween
Instinct
Mary Kills People

Renewals and cancellations

Renewals

CBC Television
22 Minutes—Renewed for a twenty-eighth season on May 27, 2020.
Baroness von Sketch Show—Renewed for a fifth and final season on May 21, 2020.
Battle of the Blades—Renewed for a sixth season on May 27, 2020.
Burden of Truth—Renewed for a fourth season on July 21, 2020.
Coroner—Renewed for a third season on May 28, 2020.
Diggstown—Renewed for a third season on July 21, 2020.
Dragons' Den—Renewed for a fifteenth season of May 27, 2020.
Frankie Drake Mysteries—Renewed for a fourth season on May 27, 2020.
The Great Canadian Baking Show—Renewed for a fourth season on May 27, 2020.
Heartland—Renewed for a fourteenth season on May 27, 2020.
Kim's Convenience—Renewed for a fifth and sixth season on April 2, 2020.
Marketplace—Renewed for a forty-seventh season on May 27, 2020.
Murdoch Mysteries—Renewed for a fourteenth season on May 13, 2020.
The Nature of Things—Renewed for a sixtieth season on May 27, 2020.
Workin' Moms—Renewed for a fifth season on May 27, 2020.
You Can't Ask That—Renewed for a second season of May 27, 2020.

Citytv
A Million Little Things—Renewed for a third season on June 22, 2020.
Bless the Harts—Renewed for a second season on June 22, 2020.
Bob's Burgers—Renewed for an eleventh season on June 22, 2020.
Brooklyn Nine-Nine—Renewed for an eighth and final season on June 22, 2020.
Chicago Fire—Renewed for a ninth season on June 22, 2020.
Chicago Med—Renewed for a sixth season on June 22, 2020.
Chicago P.D.—Renewed for an eighth season on June 22, 2020.
Dancing with the Stars—Renewed for a twenty-ninth season on June 22, 2020.
Fall in Love Fridays—Renewed for a second season on June 22, 2020.
Family Guy—Renewed for a nineteenth season on June 22, 2020.
Hudson & Rex—Renewed for a third season on June 16, 2020.
Manifest—Renewed for a third season on June 22, 2020.
Mom—Renewed for an eighth and final season on June 22, 2020.
The Simpsons—Renewed for a thirty-second season on June 22, 2020.

CTV
All Rise—Renewed for a second season on June 23, 2020.
Blue Bloods—Renewed for an eleventh season on June 23, 2020.
Bob Hearts Abishola—Renewed for a second season on June 23, 2020.
The Conners—Renewed for a second season on June 23, 2020.
The Good Doctor—Renewed for a fourth season on June 23, 2020.
Grey's Anatomy—Renewed for a seventeenth season on June 23, 2020.
Law & Order: Special Victims Unit—Renewed for a twenty-second season on June 23, 2020.
Magnum P.I.—Renewed for a third season on June 23, 2020.
The Masked Singer—Renewed for a fourth season on June 23, 2020.
The Rookie—Renewed for a third season on June 23, 2020.
Shark Tank—Renewed for a twelfth season on June 23, 2020.
Station 19—Renewed for a fourth season on June 23, 2020.
This Is Us—Renewed for a fifth season on June 23, 2020.
Who Wants to Be a Millionaire—Renewed for a second season on June 23, 2020.
Young Sheldon—Renewed for a fourth season on June 23, 2020.

Global
9-1-1—Renewed for a fourth season on June 23, 2020.
The Blacklist—Renewed for an eighth season on June 23, 2020.
Bull—Renewed for a fifth season on June 23, 2020.
FBI—Renewed for a third season on June 23, 2020.
FBI: Most Wanted—Renewed for a second season on June 23, 2020.
MacGyver—Renewed for a fifth season on June 23, 2020.
NCIS—Renewed for an eighteenth season on June 23, 2020.
NCIS: Los Angeles—Renewed for a twelfth season on June 23, 2020.
NCIS: New Orleans—Renewed for a seventh and final season on June 23, 2020.
The Neighborhood—Renewed for a third season on June 23, 2020.
New Amsterdam—Renewed for a third season on June 23, 2020.
Nurses—Renewed for a second season on June 23, 2020.
Prodigal Son—Renewed for a second season on June 23, 2020.
SEAL Team—Renewed for a fourth season on June 23, 2020.
Survivor—Renewed for a forty-fifth season on June 23, 2020.
S.W.A.T.—Renewed for a fourth season on June 23, 2020.
The Unicorn—Renewed for a second season on June 23, 2020.

Cancellations/series endings

CBC Television
Anne—Canceled on November 25, 2019, after three seasons.
Catastrophe—Concluded on February 12, 2019, after four seasons.
The Oland Murder—The documentary miniseries was meant to run for one season only.
Schitt's Creek—It was announced on March 21, 2019, that season six would be the final season. The series concluded on April 7, 2020.
Wild Bill—Canceled on November 13, 2019, by creator ITV. The series concluded on May 11, 2020.

Citytv
The Baker and the Beauty—Canceled on June 15, 2020, by creator ABC.
Bluff City Law—Canceled on June 16, 2020, by creator NBC.
Council of Dads—Canceled on June 25, 2020, by creator NBC.
Four Weddings and a Funeral—The miniseries was meant to run for one season only; it concluded on November 28, 2019.
Lincoln Rhyme: Hunt for the Bone Collector—Canceled on June 10, 2020, by creator NBC.
Perfect Harmony—Canceled on June 10, 2020, by creator NBC.
Vagrant Queen—Canceled on June 26, 2020, by creator Syfy.

CTV
Agents of S.H.I.E.L.D.—It was announced on July 18, 2019, by creator ABC that season seven would be the final season. The series concluded on August 12, 2020.
Blindspot—It was announced on May 17, 2019, by creator NBC that season five would be the final season. The series concluded on July 23, 2020.
Cardinal—It was announced in April 2019 that season four would be the final season. The series concluded on May 11, 2020.
Criminal Minds—It was announced on January 10, 2019, by creator CBS that season fifteen would be the final season. The series concluded on February 19, 2020.
Emergence—Canceled on May 21, 2020, by creator ABC.
Flirty Dancing—Canceled on January 11, 2020, by creator Fox. The series concluded on January 25, 2020.
God Friended Me—Canceled on April 14, 2020, by creator CBS, after two seasons. The series concluded on April 26, 2020.
How to Get Away with Murder—It was announced on July 11, 2019, by creator ABC that season six would be the final season. The series concluded on May 14, 2020.
I Do, Redo—On June 13, 2020, CTV pulled the series from its prime-time schedule.

CTV 2
Almost Family—Canceled on March 2, 2020, by creator Fox.
Outmatched—Canceled on May 19, 2020, by creator Fox.

Global
Carol's Second Act—Canceled on May 6, 2020, by creator CBS.
The Good Place—It was announced on June 7, 2019, by creator NBC that season four would be the final season. The series concluded on January 30, 2020.
Hawaii Five-0—It was announced on February 28, 2020, by creator CBS that season ten would be the final season. The series concluded on April 3, 2020.
Madam Secretary—It was announced on May 15, 2019, by creator CBS that season six would be the final season. The series concluded on December 8, 2019.
Modern Family—It was announced on February 5, 2019, by creator ABC that season eleven would be the final season. The series concluded on April 8, 2020.
Schooled—Canceled on May 21, 2020, by creator ABC, after two seasons.
Single Parents—Canceled on May 21, 2020, by creator ABC, after two seasons.
Tommy—Canceled on May 6, 2020, by creator CBS.
Will & Grace—It was announced on July 25, 2019, by creator NBC that season eleven would be the final season. The series concluded on April 23, 2020.

Weekly ratings

See also
 2019–20 United States network television schedule
 Impact of the COVID-19 pandemic on television

Notes

References

 
 
Canadian television schedules